Elizabeth A. Grosz (born 1952 in Sydney, Australia) is an Australian philosopher, feminist theorist, and professor working in the U.S. She is Jean Fox O'Barr Women's Studies Professor at Duke University. She has written on 20th-century French philosophers Jacques Lacan, Jacques Derrida, Michel Foucault, Luce Irigaray and Gilles Deleuze, as well as on gender, sexuality, temporality, and Darwinian evolutionary theory.

Biography
In 1981, Grosz received her PhD from the Department of General Philosophy at the University of Sydney, where she was a lecturer from 1978 to 1991. She moved to Monash University in 1992. From 1999 to 2001, she was professor of Comparative Literature and English at the State University of New York at Buffalo. She taught at Rutgers University in the Department of Women's and Gender Studies from 2002 until becoming professor of Women's Studies and Literature at Duke in 2012.

Books
 Sexual Subversions: Three French Feminists (1989)
 Jacques Lacan: A Feminist Introduction (1990)
 Volatile Bodies: Toward a Corporeal Feminism (1994)
 Space, Time and Perversion: Essays on the Politics of Bodies (1995)
 Architecture from the Outside: Essays on Virtual and Real Space (2001)
 The Nick of Time: Politics, evolution, and the untimely (2004)
 Time Travels: Feminism, nature, power (2005)
 Chaos, Territory, Art: Deleuze and the Framing of the Earth (2008)
 Becoming Undone: Darwinian Reflections on Life, Politics and Art (2011)
 The Incorporeal: Ontology, Ethics, and the Limits of Materialism (2017)

References

External links
 An Older Biography and Bibliography
 Interview
 Interview by Heather Davis in NMP23 

1952 births
Living people
Duke University faculty
Academic staff of Monash University
University at Buffalo faculty
Rutgers University faculty
Feminist theorists
Feminist philosophers
Continental philosophers